Étienne Bernard Marie de Crécy (born 25 February 1969, Lyon, France), also known as Superdiscount, EDC, Minos Pour Main Basse (Sur La Ville) and Mooloodjee, is a French DJ and producer who composes electronic music, primarily house.

Biography
Crécy was born in Lyon, but moved to Versailles from Marseille in the mid-1980s, attending the same Jules Ferry college as Air and Alex Gopher, with whom he later created the Solid label. He then worked in Paris as a sound engineer at studio +XXX ("plus thirty") where he met Philippe Zdar of Cassius, with whom he worked as Motorbass for the album Pansoul, a preview of what would be his first solo album, Super Discount, released in 1996, with Air, Alex Gopher and other French artists on Solid. Étienne de Crécy has been involved in various music projects where he worked as a producer.

Releases
Super Discount was Étienne de Crécy's first release, including the well known singles "Tout doit disparaître" (Everything must go) and "Prix Choc" (Shock Price). Super Discount is considered by many as the first album of what is called the French touch. Super Discount received very favourable reviews and sold over 200,000 copies.

Four years after Super Discount, Étienne de Crécy released Tempovision. Unlike Super Discount, which was perfectly adapted for the radio, Tempovision is a mature album, a deep reflection on the electronic music of this time. In Étienne de Crécy's opinion it was a blues album, differing from some of his earlier and more recent work.

The Tempovision track "Am I Wrong" used a sample of Millie Jackson's voice singing "Am I wrong to hunger...", from the song "(If Loving You Is Wrong) I Don't Want to Be Right". "Am I Wrong" peaked at No. 44 in the UK Singles Chart in January 2001.

The three 3D animated videos to accompany singles from the Tempovision album were directed by Étienne's brother, Geoffroy de Crécy.

Eight years after the first Super Discount album, came Super Discount 2 with the original team, and the addition of Cassius. For this album, he used only old analog instruments, for example a TB303, and produced twelve electro-house-pop-new wave songs designed for clubs, in the continuity of the first Super Discount. Pursuing the 'discount' concept of the first album, all the tracks are named after peer-to-peer clients: "Overnet", "Napster", and so on. Étienne de Crécy, talking about the concept for the third album, said: "you have to be autistic in working in the music industry not to realize that something happens through the MP3 exchanges. It’s not discount anymore! It’s free!” and added "what the music industry doesn’t understand, is that young people will not build their own music culture if they don’t have free access to the music". 

Étienne de Crécy's more recent tracks have focused more on an electronic sound. They have also begun to be released on the Pixadelic label.

Selected discography

The discography of Étienne de Crécy consists of four studio albums, one live album, three compilation albums, eighteen extended plays and fifteen singles.

Studio albums 
 Super Discount (1996, Different)
 Tempovision (2000, Solid) FR No. 57
 Super Discount 2 (2004, Solid) FR No. 72, BE (FL) No. 70
 Super Discount 3 (2015, Pixadelic/A+LSO/Sony Music) FR No. 40, BE (FL) No. 56, BE (WA) No. 103, SWI No. 99
 B.E.D (2018, PIAS, collaboration with Baxter Dury and Delilah Holliday) FR No. 153, BE (WA) No. 108

Live albums
 Live on Neptune (2007, Pixadelic) (digital only)

Compilation albums
 Tempovision Remixes (2002, Solid)
 Beats'n'Cubes Vol.1 (2011, Dim Mak)
 My Contribution to the Global Warming (2012, Pixadelic)

Extended plays and singles

References

External links
Booking – Pi-Pole
 
Watch the video-clip of the single "Someone like You"
Site of the Super Discount 2 album
Site of the Tempovision album

1969 births
Living people
French electronic musicians
French house musicians
French record producers
French DJs
Trip hop musicians
Electronic dance music DJs